Karim Naït Yahia (born December 19, 1980 in Akbou) is an Algerian football player. He currently plays for Olympique Akbou in the Béjaïa Provincial League, the 7th division of Algerian football.

Club career
In July 2011, Naït Yahia joined newly promoted CS Constantine.

References

External links
 DZFoot Profile
 

1980 births
Living people
Algerian footballers
Algerian Ligue Professionnelle 1 players
People from Akbou
Kabyle people
AS Khroub players
CS Constantine players
JSM Béjaïa players
JSM Chéraga players
MO Béjaïa players
Association football midfielders
ASO Chlef players
21st-century Algerian people